The 2005 Geelong Football Club season was the club's 106th season in the Australian Football League (AFL). Geelong finished the regular season in sixth position on the ladder. After defeating Melbourne in the Elimination Final they were defeated by Sydney in the Semi-final at the SCG.

News

Captains 

Captain: Steven King

Vice-Captain: Cameron Ling

Club list

Changes from 2005

Games

Premiership season

Finals

See also 
 2005 AFL season
 Geelong Football Club

References

External links 
 Official Website of the Geelong Football Club
 Official Website of the Australian Football League 

Geelong Football Club Season, 2005
Geelong Football Club seasons
Geelong Football Club Season, 2005